Amalda is a genus of medium-sized sea snails, a marine gastropod mollusc in the family Ancillariidae, the olives and allies.

These snails usually live in the sand in fairly shallow water in tropical and temperate regions of the world. Most species are predators of marine bivalves.

Species

Species within the genus Amalda include:

 Amalda abyssicola Schepman, 1911
 Amalda acuta Ninomiya, 1991
 † Amalda acutapex Raven & Recourt, 2018 
 Amalda alabaster Kantor, Castelin, Fedosov & Bouchet, 2020
 Amalda albanyensis Ninomiya, 1987
 Amalda albocallosa (Lischke, 1873)
 † Amalda allani (Olson, 1956) 
 Amalda allaryi Bozetti, 2007
 Amalda angustata (G.B. Sowerby II, 1859)
 Amalda aureocallosa Shikama & Oishi, 1977
 Amalda aureomarginata Kilburn & Bouchet, 1988
 Amalda aureus Ninomiya, 1990
 Amalda australis (G.B. Sowerby I, 1830)
 Amalda bathamae (Dell, 1956)
 Amalda beachportensis (Verco, 1909)
 Amalda bellonarum Kilburn & Bouchet, 1988
 Amalda benthicola (Dell, 1956)
 Amalda booleyi (Melvill & Sykes, 1896)
 Amalda borshengi Lan & Lee, 2002
 † Amalda bruneiana Harzhauser, Raven & Landau, 2018 
 Amalda bullosa Ninomiya, 1991
 Amalda bullioides (Reeve, 1864)
 Amalda cacao Kantor, Castelin, Fedosov & Bouchet, 2020
 † Amalda cincta (P. Marshall, 1918) 
 † Amalda cingulata (Olson, 1956) 
 Amalda coccinata Kilburn, 1980
 Amalda coenobium Ninomiya, 1991
 Amalda colemani Ninomiya, 1991
 Amalda concinna Ninomiya, 1990
 Amalda contusa (Reeve, 1864)
 Amalda coriolis Kilburn & Bouchet, 1988
 Amalda crosnieri Kilburn, 1993
 Amalda cupedula Kilburn, 1993
 Amalda danilai Kilburn, 1996
 Amalda decipiens (G. B. Sowerby III, 1897)
 Amalda degalleaniae Cossignani, 2018
 Amalda depressa (G.B. Sowerby II, 1859)
 Amalda dimidiata''(G.B. Sowerby II, 1859)
 Amalda dyspetes (Iredale, 1924)
 Amalda edgariana Schepman, 1911
 Amalda edithae (Pritchard & Gabriel, 1898)
 † Amalda exsputa (Bartrum & Powell, 1928) 
 Amalda fasciata Ninomiya, 1990
 Amalda festiva Ninomiya, 1991
 Amalda fuscolingua Kilburn & Bouchet, 1988
 Amalda fusiformis (Petterdi, 1886)
 † Amalda gigartoides (Olson, 1956) 
 † Amalda gulosa (C. A. Fleming, 1943)
 Amalda harasewychi Thach, 2016
 Amalda hayashii Ninomiya, 1988
 Amalda herberti Cossignani, 2013
 Amalda hilgendorfi (Martens, 1897)
 Amalda hinomotoensis (Yokoyama, 1922)
 Amalda jenneri Kilburn, 1977
 Amalda josecarlosi Pastorino, 2003
 Amalda lactea T. Kuroda, 1960
 † Amalda lanceolata (Tate, 1889) 
 Amalda lematrei Kilburn, 1993
 Amalda lindae Kilburn, 1993
 Amalda lineata (Kiener, 1844)
 Amalda lochii Ninomiya, 1990
 † Amalda macbeathi (Vella, 1954) 
 Amalda mamillata (Hinds, 1844)
 Amalda marginata (Lamarck, 1811)
 Amalda maritzae Bozzetti, 2007
 Amalda mirabelflorenti Cossignani, 2018
 † Amalda miriensis Raven & Recourt, 2018 
 Amalda miriky Kantor, Castelin, Fedosov & Bouchet, 2020
 Amalda monilifera (Reeve, 1864)
 Amalda montrouzieri (Souverby, 1860)
 † Amalda morgani (R. S. Allan, 1926) 
 Amalda mucronata (G.B. Sowerby I, 1830)
 Amalda nitidanosum Ninomiya, 1991
 Amalda northlandica (Hart, 1995)
 Amalda novaezelandiae (G.B. Sowerby II, 1859)
 Amalda obesa (G.B. Sowerby II, 1859)
 Amalda oblonga (G.B. Sowerby I, 1830)
 Amalda obtusa (Swainson, 1825)
 † Amalda olsoni Beu, 1970 
 † Amalda opima (Marwick, 1924) 
 Amalda optima (G.B. Sowerby III, 1897)
 † Amalda oraria (Olson, 1956) 
 Amalda otohime Majima, Tsuchida & Oshima, 1993
 † Amalda ovalis Beu, 1970 
 Amalda pacei Petuch, 1987
 † Amalda pakaurangiensis (Olson, 1956) 
 Amalda parentalis Shikama & Oishi, 1977
 Amalda petterdi (Tate, 1893)
 Amalda pinguis Ninomiya, 1991
 † Amalda platycephala (Powell & Bartrum, 1929) 
 Amalda ponderi Ninomiya, 1991
 † Amalda pristina (Olson, 1956) 
 Amalda procera Ninomiya, 1991
 Amalda pullarium Ninomiya, 1991
 Amalda raoulensis Powell, 1967
 Amalda reevei (E.A. Smith, 1904)
 † Amalda rimuensis (Olson, 1956) 
 † Amalda robusta (Marwick, 1924) 
 Amalda roscoae Kilburn, 1975
 Amalda rottnestensis Ninomiya, 1991
 Amalda rubiginosa (Swainson, 1823)
 Amalda rubrofasciata Ninomiya, 1991
 Amalda scopuloceti Kilburn, 1993
 Amalda siberutensis Thiele, 1925
 Amalda sibuetae Kantor & Bouchet, 1999
 Amalda sidneyensis Ninomiya, 1991
 Amalda similis (G.B. Sowerby II, 1859)
 Amalda sinensis (G.B. Sowerby II, 1859)
 Amalda southlandica (Fleming, 1948)
 † Amalda spinigera (P. Marshall, 1918) 
 † Amalda stortha (Olson, 1956) 
 Amalda tankervillii (Swainson, 1825)
 Amalda telaaraneae Kilburn, 1993
 Amalda tenuis Ninomiya, 1991
 † Amalda tholiculus (Marwick, 1931) 
 Amalda tindalli (Melvill, 1898)
 † Amalda tirangiensis (Marwick, 1926) 
 Amalda trachyzonus Kilburn, 1975
 Amalda trippneri Kilburn, 1996
 Amalda turgida Ninomiya, 1990
 Amalda utopicaNinomiya, 1987 
 Amalda venezuela Weisbord, 1962
 Amalda vernedei (G.B. Sowerby II, 1859)
 Amalda virginea Ninomiya, 1990
 † Amalda waikaiaensis (Finlay, 1926) 
 † Amalda wairarapaensis (Olson, 1956) 
 Amalda whatmoughi Kilburn, 1993

 Species brought into synonymy
 Amalda albicallosa [sic]: synonym of Amalda albocallosa (Lischke, 1873)
 Amalda ampla (Gmelin, 1791): synonym of Ancilla ampla (Gmelin, 1791)
 Amalda callifera Thiele, 1925: synonym of Amalda reevei (E.A. Smith, 1904)
 Amalda elongata (Gray, 1874): synonym of Ancillista muscae (Pilsbry, 1926)
 Amalda errorum Tomlin, 1921: synonym of Amalda angustata (G.B. Sowerby II, 1859)
 Amalda hayashi Ninomiya, 1988: synonym of Amalda rubiginosa (Swainson, 1823)
 Amalda lanceolata Ninomiya, 1991: synonym of Amalda petterdi (Tate, 1893)
 Amalda procerum Ninomiya, 1991: synonym of Amalda procera Ninomiya, 1991
 Amalda tankervillei (Swainson, 1825): synonym of Amalda tankervillii (Swainson, 1825)
 Amalda virgineus Ninomiya, 1990: synonym of Amalda virginea Ninomiya, 1990
 Amalda zeigleri Ninomiya, 1987: synonym of Amalda pacei Petuch, 1987

References

 Further reading 
 Powell A. W. B., New Zealand Mollusca, William Collins Publishers Ltd, Auckland, New Zealand 1979 
 Kilburn, R.N. & Bouchet, P. 1988. The genus Amalda in New Caledonia (Mollusca, Gastropoda, Olividae, Ancillinae). Bulletin du Muséum National d'Histoire Naturelle. Paris 4 10: 277-300
 Wilson, B. 1994. Australian Marine Shells. Prosobranch Gastropods.'' Kallaroo, WA : Odyssey Publishing Vol. 2 370 pp.

External links

  Gray, J. E. (1857). Guide to the Systematic Distribution of Mollusca in the British Museum. Part. I. London pp. XII. 230: pp
 Adams H. & Adams A. (1853-1858). The genera of Recent Mollusca; arranged according to their organization. London, van Voorst. Vol. 1: xl + 484 pp.; vol. 2: 661 pp.; vol. 3: 138 pls. [Published in parts: Vol. 1: i-xl (1858), 1–256 (1853), 257–484 (1854). Vol. 2: 1-92 (1854), 93–284 (1855), 285–412 (1856), 413–540 (1857), 541–661 (1858). Vol. 3: pl. 1-32 (1853), 33–96 (1855), 97–112 (1856), 113–128 (1857), 129–138 (1858) 
 Morgan-Richards (2019) Punctuated equilibrium in New Zealand.
 Yuri I. Kantor, Magalie Castelin, Alexander Fedosov, Philippe Bouchet (2020), The Indo-Pacific Amalda (Neogastropoda, Olivoidea, Ancillariidae) revisited with molecular data, with special emphasis on New Caledonia; European Journal of Taxonomy, [S.l.], n. 706, aug. 2020. ISSN 2118-9773

 
Ancillariidae
Gastropod genera
Taxa named by Arthur Adams (zoologist)
Taxa named by Henry Adams (zoologist)